Porphyrorhegma is a genus of moths of the family Crambidae. It contains only one species, Porphyrorhegma fortunata, which is found in North America, where it has been recorded from California.

References

Natural History Museum Lepidoptera genus database

Eurrhypini
Taxa named by Eugene G. Munroe
Crambidae genera
Monotypic moth genera